Osman Bozkurt (born 10 August 1984) is an Austrian footballer who currently plays for ATSV Hollabrunn.

External links
 
 Osman Bozkurt at ÖFB

1984 births
Living people
Austrian people of Turkish descent
Austrian footballers
Association football midfielders
SC Austria Lustenau players
FC Admira Wacker Mödling players
Wiener Sport-Club players
First Vienna FC players
Karşıyaka S.K. footballers
Akhisarspor footballers
Denizlispor footballers
SC Wiener Neustadt players
SKN St. Pölten players
SV Horn players
FC Mauerwerk players
Austrian Football Bundesliga players
2. Liga (Austria) players
Austrian Regionalliga players
TFF First League players
People from Feldkirch, Vorarlberg
Footballers from Vorarlberg